John Robert "Bob" Roses (born May 23, 1947) is a retired teacher, businessman and Republican politician in the U.S. state of Alaska.  He served a single term as a member of the Alaska House of Representatives, representing the 19th District in northeast Anchorage from 2007 to 2009. Roses was defeated for reelection by Democratic candidate Pete Petersen in November 2008.

Personal info
Roses has lived in the 19th district of Alaska for 47 years. In 1965, Bob and his father moved to Anchorage, Alaska because this was where his father was stationed. The two lived on base.

Family
In 1968, Roses married Bev Jelnek, who was from Anchorage. The two built their own house, moved in, and then raised their family.

References

External links
 Archived Official Legislative site
 Bob Roses at 100 Years of Alaska's Legislature

1947 births
Alaska Pacific University alumni
Living people
Republican Party members of the Alaska House of Representatives
People from Goldsboro, North Carolina
People from Pensacola, Florida
21st-century American politicians